How to Succeed with Sex is an American sex comedy film written and directed by Bert I. Gordon., released on October 30, 1972.

Plot
A man, who is having trouble scoring with his girlfriend, reads a book about sex and seduction to get some pointers.

Cast
Zack Taylor as Jack
Mary Jane Carpenter as Sandy
Bambi Allen as Joan
Victoria Bond as Pam
Shawn Devereaux as Phyllis
Luanne Roberts as Peggy
Keith London as Fred
Margaretta Ramsey as Margaretta

Reception
The New York Times praised the film's dialogue as ironic, literal and even occasionally funny" and said the women were "lovely".

Gene Siskel called it "repetitive and not erotic."

The Los Angeles Times said "over the years veteran low budget producer Sam Katzman has racked up a reputation for spotting a trend and cashing in on it, but he's awfully late in getting into nudies" adding the film was "not only too late, it offers too little for its genre."

References

External links

How to Succeed with Sex at TCMDB
Review of film at Shock Cinema

1970 films
American sex comedy films
Films directed by Bert I. Gordon
1970s sex comedy films
1970 comedy films
1970s English-language films
1970s American films